Mazorqueros F.C. is a Mexican football club that plays in the Liga Premier de México. The club is based in  Ciudad Guzmán, Jalisco.

History
In 1985 a club named Mazorqueros was founded in Ciudad Guzmán, Jalisco, the team participated in the third division until disappearing in the mid-1990s. In 1990, this team played a promotion playoff to Second Division B.

On May 19, 2016 the team was refounded. The squad was created to seek promotion to a higher category in addition to developing football among the local population.

On July 17, 2020 Mazorqueros was promoted to Liga Premier de México due to an expansion of participating teams in the league. However, the club maintained the Liga TDP team as a second squad.

The team won its first official title on May 8, 2022, when it won the Torneo Clausura 2022 after defeating Cafetaleros de Chiapas. After the tournament ended, most of the squad and technical staff of this team was used to form the Atlético La Paz from Liga de Expansión MX, a team that shares ownership with Mazorqueros F.C. After the founding of the new team at La Paz, Baja California Sur, Mazorqueros became the reserve team of Atlético La Paz and was relocated to the Serie B de México because it became a development team.

Honors
Serie A de México Champions: 1
Clausura 2022

Tercera División de México Champions: 1
2021–2022

Players

Current squad

See also
Atlético La Paz
Liga Premier de México

References

External links

Football clubs in Jalisco
2016 establishments in Mexico
Liga Premier de México
Association football clubs established in 2016